John Blackadder or Blackader may refer to:
John Blackadder (preacher) ( 1622–1685), Scottish Covenanter
John Blackadder (soldier) (1664–1729), Scottish soldier, son of the preacher
Sir John Blackadder, 1st Baronet (1626–c. 1670), of the Blackadder baronets